John Edwards (born 1953) is an American politician who was a candidate for the 2008 Democratic presidential nomination.

John Edwards may also refer to:

Entertainment
 John Edwards (1699–1776), Welsh poet
 John Edwards (1747–1792), Welsh poet
 John Edwards (1751–1832), Irish poet
 John Edwards (painter) (1742–1815), English painter, designer, illustrator and botanist
 John Kelt Edwards (1875–1934), Welsh artist and cartoonist
 John Paul Edwards (1884–1968), American photographer
 John Uzzell Edwards (1934–2014), Welsh painter
 John Edwards (singer) (born 1944), American R&B singer for the Spinners
 John Edwards (musician) (born 1953), English bass guitarist for Status Quo
 John Edwards (producer) (born 1953), Australian television drama producer
 Johnny Edwards (musician), singer for the band Foreigner

Politics

United States
 John Edwards (Kentucky politician) (1748–1837), Anti-Administration party
 John Edwards (Charleston politician) (1760–1798), mayor of Charleston, South Carolina
 John Stark Edwards (1777–1813), Ohio's 6th congressional district
 John Edwards (New York politician) (1781–1850), 15th congressional district, 1837–1839
 John Edwards (Pennsylvania politician) (1786–1843), 4th congressional district Anti-Mason (1839–1841) and Whig (1841–1843)
 John Cummins Edwards (1804–1888), Democrat from Missouri; Congress at-large (1841–1843); governor (1844–1848)
 John Edwards (Arkansas politician) (1805–1894), 3rd congressional district (March 1871 – February 1872)
 John Edwards (Wisconsin politician) (1831–1891), Wisconsin State Assembly
 John H. Edwards (banker) (1875–1955), Assistant Secretary of the Treasury
 John S. Edwards (Virginia politician) (born 1943), in the Senate of Virginia
 John Edwards (Rhode Island politician) (born 1958), state legislator in Rhode Island
 John Bel Edwards (born 1966), Governor of Louisiana
 John Charles Edwards, Arkansas House of Representatives

United Kingdom
 John Edwards (MP for Bridgwater) (fl. 1562–1573), MP for Bridgwater
 John Edwards (MP for Denbighshire) (c. 1562–1625), MP for Denbighshire
 John Edwards (MP for Flint Boroughs) (died 1635), MP for Flint Boroughs
 Sir John Edwards, 1st Baronet, of Garth (1770–1850), British MP for Montgomery (1833–1841)
 John Edwards-Vaughan (1772–1833), British MP for Glamorganshire and Wells
 John Passmore Edwards (1823–1911), British Liberal MP for Salisbury, elected in 1880; also newspaperman and philanthropist
 J. Hugh Edwards (1869–1945), British Liberal MP for Mid Glamorgan (1910–1918); Neath (1918–1922); Accrington (1923–1929)
 John Edwards (Welsh politician) (1882–1960), British Liberal MP for Aberavon (1918–1922)
 John Edwards (Labour politician) (1904–1959), British MP for Blackburn (1945–1950); Brighouse and Spenborough (1950–1959)

Elsewhere
 John Edwards (Australian politician) (1820–1872), member of the Queensland Legislative Assembly
 John Wesley Edwards (1865–1929), Conservative politician from Ontario; House of Commons (1908–1921 and 1925–1929)
 John Edwards (regulator), New Zealand-born incoming Information Commissioner for the United Kingdom

Religion
 John Edwards (divine) (1637–1716), English Calvinistic divine
 John Edwards (minister) (1714–1785), English dissenting minister at Leeds, Yorkshire
 John Edwards (Unitarian minister) (1768–1808), English nonconformist and political radical
 John Edwards (missionary) (1828–1903), American protestant minister to the Choctaw Nation, best known for work at Wheelock Mission in present-day Oklahoma
 John Edwards (hymnist) (1805–1885), Welsh Anglican priest and hymn composer
 John Edwards (archdeacon of St Asaph) (1889–1976), Welsh Anglican priest

Sports
 John Hawley Edwards (1850–1893), footballer in England and Wales; a founder of Welsh Football Association
 Jack Edwards (cricketer, born 1860) (John Dunlop Edwards, 1860–1911), Australian cricketer
 John Edwards (footballer, born 1875) (1875–?), English soccer player
 John Edwards (Canadian football) (1912–2005), Canadian football player
 John Edwards (cricketer, born 1928) (1928–2002), Australian cricketer
 John Edwards (Barbadian cricketer) (1909–1976), Barbadian cricketer
 John Edwards (Australian footballer) (born 1942), Australian rules footballer
 John Edwards (canoeist) (born 1954), Canadian sprint canoer
 John Edwards (basketball) (born 1981), American basketball player
 John Edwards (racing driver) (born 1991), American racing driver

Other
 John Edwards (academic) (1600–1660?), professor of Natural Philosophy at Oxford University 1638–1648
 John Edwards (Siôn Treredyn) (1605/6–1656), Welsh translator who used the pen name "Siôn Treredyn"
 John Edwards (American Civil War sailor) (1831–1902), member of U.S. Navy who was awarded Medal of Honor during the Civil War
 John Newman Edwards (1839–1889), American frontier writer and newspaperman
 John D. Edwards (1885–1918), American naval officer awarded the Navy Cross
 John Bryn Edwards (1889–1922), Welsh ironmaster and philanthropist
 John Ellis Edwards (1922–1979), Tuskegee airman
 John Menlove Edwards (1910–1958), English child psychologist and poet
 John H. Edwards (1928–2007), British medical geneticist
 John Robert Edwards (born 1947), professor of psychology and language in Nova Scotia
 John A. Edwards (born 1960), Irish judge
 John M. Edwards, professor of surgery
 John Edwards (British Army officer) (1896–?)
 John Edwards (antiquarian) (1846–1937), Scottish lawyer, palaeographer and collector, see Edwards Professor of Medieval History

See also
Jack Edwards (disambiguation)
Jackie Edwards (disambiguation)
John Edwards Holbrook (1796–1871), American zoologist, naturalist and physician
John Edward (disambiguation)
Jonathan Edwards (disambiguation)
John & Edward, X Factor finalists
Edwards (surname)